Salvador Fúnez Sardina (born 2 June 1981 in Madrid), commonly known as Salva, is a Spanish former professional footballer who played as a central defender, currently assistant manager of Girona FC.

External links

1981 births
Living people
Spanish footballers
Footballers from Madrid
Association football defenders
Segunda División players
Segunda División B players
Tercera División players
CD Leganés B players
CD Leganés players
Alicante CF footballers
AD Alcorcón footballers
Rayo Vallecano players
Girona FC non-playing staff